The 2007 NASCAR Canadian Tire Series was the inaugural season for the NASCAR Canadian Tire Series with the first event being held on May 26, 2007 at Cayuga Motor Speedway and Don Thomson Jr. won in a spirited battle for the first series win. Andrew Ranger, in his first year of stock-car competition, won the second race at Mosport International Raceway. He took over the lead in the point standings after that event and never relinquished it on his way to the first championship. The first season saw no less than five races decided on last lap passes.

Schedule

Results

Standings

The top 10

See also
2007 NASCAR Nextel Cup Series
2007 NASCAR Busch Series
2007 NASCAR Craftsman Truck Series
2007 NASCAR Busch East Series
2007 NASCAR Corona Series

References
 Official Website

External links
Canadian Tire Series Standings and Statistics for 2007

NASCAR Canadian Tire Series season

NASCAR Pinty's Series